Holy Father may refer to:

God the Father, the title given to the first person of the Trinity in Christianity and sometimes to a god in other religions
An honorific often used instead of, or prefixed to, the name of the Catholic Pope
An Eastern Orthodox usage referring to one of the Church Fathers